Gyaca may refer to:

Gyaca County, county in Tibet
Gyaca, Tibet, village in Tibet